Roland Roberts (October 22, 1897 in San Francisco, California—March 31, 1965 in San Francisco, California) was an American male tennis player.

Tennis career
In 1918 he became the Pacific Coast lawn tennis champion. In a tournament that lacked most of the top class players who were drafted into service due to World War I he defeated Victor Breeden in the final in straight sets.

In 1920 he reached the final of the men's doubles competition at the U.S. National Championships together with Willis E. Davis which they lost to Clarence Griffin and Bill Johnston in three straight sets.

In July 1920 he won the National Clay Court Tennis Championship, played at the South Side Tennis Club in Chicago, after beating Vincent Richards in three straight sets.

As an 18-year-old at the Cincinnati Masters, he reached the quarterfinals in 1916 before falling to Dean Mathey of Princeton, 6-2, 7-5, 3-6, 4-6, 6-3.

Grand Slam finals

Doubles

Runners-up (1)

References

American male tennis players
1897 births
1965 deaths